The Man Who Drew God is a 2022 drama film directed by Franco Nero and starring Nero, Kevin Spacey, and Faye Dunaway. It marks Spacey's first role after sexual misconduct allegations against him surfaced in 2017. Based on a true story, the film depicts a blind man who could draw portraits of people by hearing their voice in 1950s Italy. Nero portrays the blind artist, Spacey a police detective, and Dunaway a braille teacher who is an old friend of the artist.

The film was released in Russia on video on demand on 21 November 2022. It had its Italian premiere at a screening in Turin in conjunction with the Torino Film Festival on 5 December 2022. It was released in Italy on 2 March 2023.

Cast
 Franco Nero as Emanuele
 Kevin Spacey (dubbed by Roberto Pedicini) as the police detective
 Faye Dunaway (dubbed by ) as Tasha
 Robert Davi (dubbed by Michele Gammino) as the lawyer Fauci
 Stefania Rocca as Pola
 Massimo Ranieri as Bettler
 Alessia Alciati as Alessia
  as Fiamma
 Kathleen Hagen (dubbed by ) as Lina Forzosi
  as Desirè
 Emanuela Petroni as Shannon Lear
 Isabel Ciammaglichella (dubbed by Chiara Fabiano) as Iaia
 Sofia Nistratova (dubbed by Anita Sala) as Matilda
 Fernanda Maffé (dubbed by ) as Ninetta
 Gabriele Barbone (dubbed by Diego Follega) as Emanuele as a child
 Andrea Cocco (dubbed by ) as Livio
 Vittorio Boscolo (dubbed by ) as the producer
 Sophie D'Ambra (dubbed by Simona D'Angelo) as the colf
 Marco Deambrogio (dubbed by ) as the oculist

Production
On 23 May 2021, ABC News reported that Spacey and Vanessa Redgrave, Nero's wife, would star in the film and that it would soon be shot in Italy. On casting Spacey, Nero told the outlet, "I'm very happy Kevin agreed to participate in my film. I consider him a great actor and I can't wait to start the movie." Later that day, producer Louis Nero told Variety that Spacey and Redgrave's roles are small, while the main character is played by Franco Nero, and that Redgrave's appearance was not finalised but would depend on whether she could travel from England to Italy. On 26 May, Redgrave announced that she had turned down the role. On 7 July 2021, Variety reported that Redgrave had been replaced by Dunaway and that the film was being sold at the Cannes Marché du Film. It quoted Louis Nero as saying, "We have plenty of interest from buyers around the world. All the controversy around the film has generated plenty of interest ... It was good for the film, from my point of view." It was reported that the film involves the protagonist wrongly accused of sexually abusing a child, but Louis Nero told Entertainment Weekly that the film "does not involve pedophilia". However, according to Il Messaggero, which interviewed Spacey, Spacey portrays "a commissioner who arrests an alleged molester and then releases him because he is innocent".

Filming took place from 28 May to 3 July 2021 in Turin.

References

External links
 
 The Man Who Drew God at Filmitalia

2020s Italian-language films
2020s English-language films
Italian drama films
American drama films
Russian drama films
Films about blind people
Films about fictional painters
Films shot in Italy